Lester Smith Barnard (October 25, 1894 – June 1, 1985) was an American football, basketball, baseball, and track coach. He served as the head football coach at West Tennessee Normal State School—now known as the University of Memphis—from 1922 to 1923 and Central Michigan University from 1924 to 1925, compiling a career college football coaching record of 22–7–6. Barnard was also the head basketball coach at West Tennessee from 1922 to 1924 and Central Michigan from 1924 to 1926, tallying a career college basketball mark of 22–37. He was a twin brother of Chester S. Barnard. In 1985, he died at the age of 90 in California.

Head coaching record

College football

References

External links
 

1894 births
1985 deaths
American football ends
American men's basketball players
Basketball coaches from Missouri
Basketball players from Missouri
Central Michigan Chippewas baseball coaches
Central Michigan Chippewas football coaches
Central Michigan Chippewas men's basketball coaches
Great Lakes Navy Bluejackets football players
Memphis Tigers baseball coaches
Memphis Tigers football coaches
Memphis Tigers men's basketball coaches
Missouri State Bears basketball players
Missouri State Bears football players
Northwestern Wildcats football players
College track and field coaches in the United States
High school basketball coaches in Oklahoma
High school football coaches in Oklahoma
People from Rogersville, Missouri